José del Ramo Núñez (born 28 May 1960) is a Spanish former professional racing cyclist. He rode in the 1985 Tour de France. After his career he founded the bike helmet company Catlike in Yecla.

References

External links
 

1960 births
Living people
Spanish male cyclists
Sportspeople from the Province of Albacete
Cyclists from Castilla-La Mancha